Agam is a Bangalore-based contemporary Carnatic progressive rock band. The band was formed in the year 2003. The current lineup consists of Harish Sivaramakrishnan (vocals) Swamy Seetharaman (keyboards and lyricist), T Praveen Kumar (lead guitar), Aditya Kasyap (bass guitar and backing vocals), Sivakumar Nagarajan (ethnic percussions), Jagadish Natarajan (rhythm guitar) and Yadhunandan (Drummer). Jagadish Natarajan replaced Suraj Satheesh as the rhythm guitarist in 2012 but the lineup of the band has otherwise remained same. Vignesh Lakshminarayanan was replaced by Aditya Kasyap on bass and backing vocals. Agam is often featured on the Malayalam music channel Kappa TV.

Early years and band formation

Formation 
All the band members are from South India, and a majority of them studied at Birla Institute of Technology and Science, Pilani. There Harish and Ganesh started off with short jamming sessions and pursued it even after graduation, which eventually led to the formation of the band. Their musical journey started in an apartment studio where they started experimenting with various compositions of music under the name ‘Studio F6’, which they later renamed as 'Agam'.

Early years (2003-2007) 
Agam received its big break in the year 2007 when it participated in a band hunt called “Ooh la la la,” hosted by the Tamil television channel Sun TV. The competition was judged by the Oscar-winning Indian music composer A. R. Rahman. Rahman was impressed by the band's potential and adjudged them one of the winners of the contest. Their success in “Ooh la la la” brought them into mainstream and they performed in concerts and music festivals in South Indian cities like Bangalore, Chennai, and Hyderabad.

Mainstream (2007-) 
Post-2010, Agam started gaining more popularity nationwide and played in several high-profile music festivals such as the Chennai Sangamam, the MAD Festival (where they played alongside several distinguished bands such as The Raghu Dixit Project, Indian Ocean, Avial, Motherjane, Soulmate, Swarathma), the Fireflies Festival, Octoberfest, and the Storm Festival. The band has also played at venues such as Hard Rock Café, both at Hyderabad and Bangalore, and Kyra, Bangalore They have also performed at college fests such as Pravega in the Indian Institute of Science in Bangalore, Festember in the National Institute of Technology, Tiruchirappalli, Dhwani in College of Engineering, Trivandrum, Symbhav in Symbiosis Law School, Pune, Tathva in National Institute of Technology Calicut, R.V. College of Engineering, Bengaluru, Indian Institute of Science Education and Research, Pune, Indian Institute of Science Education and Research, Thiruvananthapuram and all three campuses of Birla Institute of Technology and Science, Pilani in India.

Apart from these, Agam has also performed in many charitable events.

Agam has also been featured in other television channels. Their well-known performances includes the one for the entertainment channel Rosebowl. They also performed in the second season of Coke Studio (India) which started on July 7, 2012. The band performed in the final episode of the season, which has only the performances of independent music producers.

Agam has performed at Malaysian Independent Live Fusion Festival in 2017 and 2018 and also in Singapore's KalaUtsavam in 2012 and 2017 at the Esplanade Theatres. In June 2018, they performed at London's Southbank Centre as part of the summer contemporary music season.

Musical style 
Agam's musical style is Carnatic progressive rock. Their music is a blend of Carnatic music and rock. The band draws inspirations from traditional Carnatic music and progressive rock acts such as Dream Theater. Their logo is inspired by the folk art Theyyam of North Kerala. The band borrows their name from the Malayalam / Tamil word 'Agam' which means the 'Heart, soul or the Inner soul'.

Collaborations 
Agam has collaborated with many individual musicians over the course of 5 years. Among them was their collaboration with acclaimed Indian playback singer Shreya Ghoshal for a song titled Live Again and with Aruna Sairam for Navotsavam

Albums 
Agam released its debut album - The Inner Self awakens in October 2012 at Hard Rock Cafe, Bangalore. The album went on to become the top selling album on Flipkart's flyte as well as on Oklisten.com.

Their sophomore album "A Dream to Remember" was launched in November 2017. The prelude of the album, "Saagara Shayana Vibho" was launched on 11 October 2017. The eight songs in the album, Four of them being Carnatic kritis were launched as an Audio-Visual production, directed by Mithun Raj and sound-engineered by Hriday Goswami. In 2020, they gave vocals to one of the songs in Yennum Yellow, which is the EP album released by Kerala Blasters FC as a tribute to their fans. They performed in the song named as "Theekkali" which was written by Manu Manjith.

Debut film 
Agam's movie debut came out in September 2017 as one of the composers for the movie Solo, directed by Bejoy Nambiar. They have done two tracks - Oru Vanchi Pattu - sung by Harish Sivaramakrishnan and Thaalolam - sung by Shashaa Tirupati. Manu Manjith has penned the lyrics for 'Thaalolam'. "Oru Vanchi Pattu" reuses the lyrics from their earlier track "The Boat Song".

Awards and recognition 
 Winner of “Ooh la la la” – Music reality show hosted by Sun TV, and judged by A. R. Rahman, 2007
 Featured in Music of contemporary India commissioned by the Ministry of External Affairs, India
 Winner of Bite My Music Global awards (the largest independent music awards of south Asia) – for Best Collaboration (Live Again feat. Shreya Ghoshal), and Best Instrumental (Brahma's Dance)
 Collaboration with Shreya Ghoshal on the single "Live again" to raise awareness on breast cancer

See also
Indian rock
Kryptos (band)
Bhayanak Maut
Nicotine (band)
Inner Sanctum (band)
Scribe (band)
Demonic Resurrection
Harish Sivaramakrishnan

References

External links 
 

Indian progressive rock groups
Musical groups established in 2003